"Växeln hallå" is a song written by Lasse Holm (music) and Gert Lengstrand (lyrics), and performed by Janne "Lucas" Persson ending up 2nd at Melodifestivalen 1980.

The single peaked at 6th place at the Swedish singles chart. The song also stayed at Svensktoppen for ten weeks between the period of 30 March-1 June 1980, spending three weeks at the top.

The song was also recorded as "Doctor hallo".

Cover versions and usage in media 

Swedish heavy metal band "Black Ingvars" recorded the song for their 1998 album Schlager Metal.

Credits and personnel 

 Janne Lucas – vocals
 Lasse Holm – songwriter
 Gert Lengstrand – songwriter

Credits and personnel adopted from the 7-inch single liner notes.

Charts

References

External links 

 

1980 songs
1980 singles
Janne Lucas songs
Mariann Grammofon singles
Melodifestivalen songs of 1980
Songs about telephone calls
Songs written by Lasse Holm
Songs written by Gert Lengstrand
Swedish-language songs